Szentes is a town in south-eastern Hungary, Csongrád county, near the Tisza river. The town is a cultural and educational center of the region.

Notable people
Árpád Balázs (born 1937), classical music composer
János Bácskai 1954. november 27, actor
János Berkes (born 1946 May 24) opera singer (tenor)
István Bugyi (1898-1981) surgeon - The local hospital named after him
Dóra Dúró (born 1987), politician
Jozsef Gera (born 1937) aircraft engineer, former chief of the Dynamics and Controls Branch at NASA
László Gyimesi (born 1948), pianist
Mihály Horváth (1809–1878), Roman Catholic bishop
Tamás Kecskés (born 1986), footballer 
Zsolt Koncz (born 1977), footballer 
László Márkus (1881-1948), drama author, director, member of the Hungarian Opera
András Mészáros (born 1941), former cyclist
Ibolya Nagy (1864–1946), actress
Lajos Őze (1935–1984), actor
László Papp (1905–1989), wrestler
István Szelei (born 1960), fencer
Lajos Szilassi (born 1942), mathematician
Konrád Verebélyi (born 1995), footballer
Zséda (born 1974), singer
László Terney (1947-1998) architect
László Ujréti (born 1942) actor, voice actor
Péter Szalay (born 1962), quantum chemist, theoretical chemist

Twin towns – sister cities

Szentes is twinned with:

 Bačka Topola, Serbia
 Buñol, Spain
 Dumbrăvița, Romania
 Hof Ashkelon, Israel
 Kaarina, Finland
 Markgröningen, Germany
 Sankt Augustin, Germany
 Sfântu Gheorghe, Romania
 Skierniewice, Poland
 Svätuše, Slovakia

Gallery

References

External links

  in Hungarian, English, German and Serb
 Városi Visszhang - Szentes
 Local Radio Station - Radio 451

Populated places in Csongrád-Csanád County